Jeremiah Murphy may refer to:

 Jeremiah Henry Murphy (1835–1893), member of the U.S. House of Representatives from Iowa, 1883–1887
 Jeremiah Murphy (piper) (fl. 1811–15), Irish piper
 Jeremiah J. Murphy (1858–1932), United States Army soldier and Medal of Honor recipient
 Jerry Murphy (Jeremiah Michael Murphy, born 1959), retired English footballer
 Jeremiah C. Murphy (1875–1925), Alaska Attorney General, 1919–1920
 Jeremiah V. Murphy (1927-2005), columnist for The Boston Globe